Johanna Danois (born 4 April 1987 in Saint-Claude, Guadeloupe) is a French sprinter. She competed for the French team in the 4 × 100 metres relay at the 2012 Summer Olympics, which was disqualified in Round 1.

References

1987 births
Living people
French female sprinters
French people of Guadeloupean descent
Olympic athletes of France
Athletes (track and field) at the 2012 Summer Olympics
People from Saint-Claude, Guadeloupe
Olympic female sprinters